Jiyūgaoka Station may refer to:
Jiyūgaoka Station (Tokyo) -- (自由が丘駅) A station in Tokyo, operated by Tokyo Kyuko Electric Railway.
Jiyūgaoka Station (Nagoya) -- (自由ヶ丘駅) A station in Nagoya, Aichi Prefecture, operated by Transportation Bureau City of Nagoya.